The Las Vegas Symphony Orchestra is an American symphony orchestra, based in Las Vegas, Nevada. It was founded in 1985. Originally it was organized only to be a backup for popular Vegas touring headliners. It is sometimes referred to as just simply "Vegas Symphony". The entity was purchased by Broadway producer / entrepreneur Shea Arender on January 5, 2017.

References

American orchestras
Musical groups from Las Vegas
Musical groups established in 1985
1985 establishments in Nevada